"Hot Limit" is the 13th single from the Japanese group HIGH and MIGHTY COLOR and was the first single after the release of their 4th album, Rock Pit. The title track from the single is a cover of the 1998 single from T.M. Revolution. This was the second time the group has covered a song, the first being a cover of a Luna Sea song used for a special tribute cover album. The group's official website describes the title track as a fun summer anthem.

Information
Hot Limit was the second time the group was covered a song from another artist, the first being Rosier, a song originally done by the group Luna Sea. T.M. Revolution appears in the promotional video for the single. A limited edition release of the single contains the promotional video for the single. The idea came to the group while on tour with T.M. Revolution's band, abingdon boys school. Maki is the lead vocalist for the title track of the single, stating that she wished to put her own original twist on a classic summer theme. On May 21 it was announced that three different versions of the song would be available through cell-phone purchase, a special HOT LIMIT introduction version, a Brilliant Summer version as well as a ring tone version of the song released through a QR Code posted on group's official website. Three more versions of the song were made available in ring tone format using a different QR Code posted on the group's official website. The music video for HOT LIMIT was released on May 26, 2008 exclusively on M-ON music channel. A Hot Limit Star Pencil marker will be packed with the special edition releases of the single.

The single's first day on the Oricon charts had it ranked at the #11 spot. This is the highest ranking day for a single from the group since 2006's Enrai ~Tooku ni Aru Akari~ which managed to reach the 9th spot on its third day. The single would go on to remain in the top 30 for the rest of the week and take a weekly ranking of #20, eliciting the best sales from a single or album from the group since Enrai's release. Due to news of Maki's departure, sales and downloads of the single were bolstered, pushing the single up as much as 10 spots on the Oricon chart.

Eurobeat mix

The single was later remixed and sold as a digital single known as HOT LIMIT -EUROBEAT MIX-, featuring a much more eurobeat and dance style than that of the original single. A video was also released for the single that was released exclusively on SME websites.

Music video
The video for Hot Limit features Maki riding through an unnamed city on a motorcycle. She then joins the rest of the group atop a building and steps upon an orange star platform as the song beings and the group performs the song. The video is seen as both a standard video intertwined with behind the scenes footage of T.M. Revolution are shown as he directs the video. The style of the video was meant to mimic that of the original, including an orange star platform as well as Maki in an outfit similar to the original worn by T.M. Revolution along with the same dance used by in the original video.

Track listing 

 HOT LIMIT
 
 
 HOT LIMIT-Instrumental-

Sales

Oricon

Current total: 11,738

Japanese Digital Sales charts

References 

2008 singles
High and Mighty Color songs
2008 songs
Sony Music Entertainment Japan singles

ja:HOT LIMIT#HIGH and MIGHTY COLOR によるカバー作品